Vanessa Lee (1963–1992) was a British singer and actress.

Vanessa Lee may also refer to:

Vanessa Lee (archer) (born 1988), Canadian archer
Vanessa Lee Evigan (born 1981), American actress
Vanessa Lee Chester (born 1984), American television actress
Vanessa Lee Carlton (born 1980), American musician
Vanessa Lee Buckner (1931–2006), Canadian serial killer
Vanessa Marie Lee (born 1983), Singaporean netball player